The Little Pend Oreille National Wildlife Refuge is a wildlife preserve, one of the national wildlife refuges operated by the United States Fish and Wildlife Service. The refuge is located east of Colville, Washington, along the west slope of the Selkirk Mountain Range. It lies mostly in eastern Stevens County, with a small part extending eastward into western Pend Oreille County. It is the only mountainous, mixed-conifer forest refuge outside Alaska and the largest in Washington state.

Wildlife found in the refuge include numerous songbirds, bald eagles, elk, black bears, timber wolves, cougars, moose, beavers, and white-tailed deer.

Public uses include hunting, fishing, hiking, camping, and horseback riding.

Gallery

References

External links
Little Pend Oreille National Wildlife Refuge U.S. Fish and Wildlife Service
Friends of the Little Pend Oreille National Wildlife Refuge

National Wildlife Refuges in Washington (state)
Protected areas of Pend Oreille County, Washington
Protected areas of Stevens County, Washington